In mathematics, the Atiyah–Bott fixed-point theorem, proven by Michael Atiyah and Raoul Bott in the 1960s, is a general form of the Lefschetz fixed-point theorem for smooth manifolds M, which uses an elliptic complex on M. This is a system of elliptic differential operators on vector bundles, generalizing the de Rham complex constructed from smooth differential forms which appears in the original Lefschetz fixed-point theorem.

Formulation

The idea is to find the correct replacement for the Lefschetz number, which in the classical result is an integer counting the correct contribution of a fixed point of a smooth mapping

The Atiyah–Bott theorem is an equation in which the LHS must be the outcome of a global topological (homological) calculation, and the RHS a sum of the local contributions at fixed points of f.

Assuming M a closed manifold should ensure then that the set of intersections is finite, yielding a finite summation as the RHS of the expected formula. Further data needed relates to the elliptic complex of vector bundles , namely a bundle map

for each j, such that the resulting maps on sections give rise to an endomorphism of an elliptic complex . Such an endomorphism  has Lefschetz number

which by definition is the alternating sum of its traces on each graded part of the homology of the elliptic complex.

The form of the theorem is then

The outer summation is over the fixed points x, and the inner summation  over the index j in the elliptic complex.

Specializing the Atiyah–Bott theorem to the de Rham complex of smooth differential forms yields the original Lefschetz fixed-point formula. A famous application of the Atiyah–Bott theorem is a simple proof of the Weyl character formula in the theory of Lie groups.

History

The early history of this result is entangled with that of the Atiyah–Singer index theorem. There was other input, as is suggested by the alternate name Woods Hole fixed-point theorem that was used in the past (referring properly to the case of isolated fixed points). A 1964 meeting at Woods Hole brought together a varied group:

Eichler started the interaction between fixed-point theorems and automorphic forms. Shimura played an important part in this development by explaining this to Bott at the Woods Hole conference in 1964.

As Atiyah puts it:

[at the conference]...Bott and I learnt of a conjecture of Shimura concerning a generalization of the Lefschetz formula for holomorphic maps. After much effort we convinced ourselves that there should be a general formula of this type [...]; . 

and they were led to a version for elliptic complexes.

In the recollection of William Fulton, who was also present at the conference, the first to produce a proof was Jean-Louis Verdier.

Proofs
In the context of algebraic geometry, the statement applies for smooth and proper varieties over an algebraically closed field.

See also

Bott residue formula

Notes

References
.  This states a theorem calculating the Lefschetz number of an endomorphism of an elliptic complex.
These gives the proofs and some applications of the results announced in the previous paper.

External links
 
 

Fixed-point theorems
Theorems in differential topology